Odeon is the sixth studio album and second concept album by Tosca released under Studio !K7.

Track listing
 Zur Guten Ambience - 3:01
 What If - 4:55
 Heatwave - 5:39
 JayJay - 6:18
 Soda - 2:33
 Meixner - 6:04
 Stuttgart - 5:46
 In My Brain Prinz Eugen - 5:06
 Cavallo - 6:39
 Bonjour - 5:24

Personnel

Tosca
 Richard Dorfmeister - composer, primary artist, producer
 Rupert Huber - composer, primary artist, producer

Other musicians on the album
 Sarah Carlier - composer, lyricist, vocals
 Chris Eckman - composer, lyricist, vocals
 Rodney Hunter - vocals
 J.J.Jones - composer, lyricist, vocals
 Lucas Santtana - composer, lyricist, vocals
 Roland Neuwirth - composer, lyricist, vocals
 Calyx Berlin - mastering
 Stefan Beyer - design
 Markus Rössle - photography
 Colin Snapp - visual arts

References

External links
 http://www.allmusic.com/album/odeon-mw0002456133/credits
 https://toscamusic.com/discography/odeon/

2013 albums
Tosca (band) albums
Ambient dub albums